Shergotty may refer to:
Sherghati, also called Shergotty, subdivision-level town of the Gaya district in Bihar, India.
Shergotty (meteorite)